Popular music began to replace folk music in Slovakia beginning in the 1950s, when Slovakia was a part of Czechoslovakia; American jazz, R&B, and rock and roll were popular, alongside waltzes, polkas, and czardas, among other folk forms. By the end of the 1950s, radios were common household items, though only state stations were legal. Slovak popular music began as a mix of bossa nova, cool jazz, and rock, with propagandistic lyrics. Dissenters listened to ORF (Austrian Radio), Radio Luxembourg, or Radio Free Europe, which played more rock. Czechoslovakia was more passive in the face of Soviet domination, and thus radio and the whole music industry toed the line more closely than other satellite states.

After the Velvet Revolution and the declaration of the Slovak state, domestic music greatly diversified as free enterprise allowed a great expansion in the number of bands and genres represented in the Slovak market. Soon, however, major label brought pop music to Slovakia and drove many of the small companies out of business. The 1990s, American grunge and alternative rock, and Britpop gain a wide following, as well as a newfound popularity in musicals.

John Dopyera and his brothers, the inventors of the resonator guitar (DOpjera BROthers-Dobro, were born in Slovakia.

Late 20th century's and today's musicians and music groups

Metal
 Achsar
 Algor
 Apoplexy
 April Weeps
 Bestialit
 Čad
 Dementor
 Depresy
 Doomas
 Editor
 Mystic Death
 King (SVK)
 Galadriel
 Laburnum Diver

Hardcore 

 Flow
 Junk

Crossover Thrash 

 Kershik

Hard Rock
 The Maybe
 Dorian Grey

Jazz Rock
 Fermata
 Dežo Ursiny

Rock
 Arzén
 Bez Ladu a Skladu
 Desmod
 Atlantída
 Elán
 
 Good Fancy
 Free Faces
 HEX
 Chiki Liki Tu-a
 IMT Smile
 Le Payaco
 Metalinda
 Neuropa
 No Gravity (band)
 Out of Control
 TEAM
 Tublatanka
 Nocadeň
 Para

Art Rock
 Marián Varga
 The Bridgeheads

Pop Rock
 Peha
 Good Fancy
 Peoples
 Abscondo

Rap
 TCZY
 Terapia
 Drvivá menšina
 Čistychov
 Hanny
 PravyOpak
 Suchý pes
 L.U.Z.A.
 DK LUKY podzemie
 Miky Mora
 Názov Stavby
 Vec
 Zverina
 Veta a Orbit
 Rendezska SK
 Strnastka
 Druhá Strana
 Severná Strana
 Kontrafakt
 Gramo Rokkaz
 DMS
 Elpe
 BoyBand
 Moja Reč
Rapuj Roger!

Punk Rock
 Iné Kafe
 Horkýže Slíže
 Horská Chata
 Plus Mínus
 Punkreas
 Zóna A
 HT
 Slobodná Európa
 Odpad
 Brickfield
 EX-tip
 DPH
 Davová Psychóza
 Prípad Ewy Burdovej
 Dimenzia X
 Konflikt
 Zhoda Náhod
 Dr.Pako
 Sitňan
 Mladé Rozlety
 Kóta 22
 Street Spirit
 Toy Pištols
 Pivnica
 D Zmrds
 Immunita
 Načo Názov
 Vandali
 Hasiaci Prístroj
 Kaktus
 Lord Alex
 Dissident
 Poďme do práce
 The Kľemones
 Metamorfóza
 Illegality
 Karpina
 Princovia
 Decis
 Bačova fujara
 Nekultúra
 Norton
 Punkhart
 Tri groše
 Strata času
 Začiatok konca
 S.R.O
 Živý plot
 Železná Kolóna
 Č.O.V.
 S.N.P.

Ska
 Polemic
 Ska2tonics
 Skaprašupina
 Hudba z marsu
 Lepayaco
 Vedro
 Bublifunk
 Fuera Fondo

See also
 Music of Slovakia
 Slovak folk music
 Slovakia in the Eurovision Song Contest
 ZAI Awards
 The 100 Greatest Slovak Albums of All Time

Samples
 Lunatic Gods - alternative metal band, which plays also some folk music instruments, like fujara and drumbla.

References

Pop
Popular music by country